Cork Public Museum is a city museum in Cork, Ireland. Housed in a mid-19th century building within Fitzgerald Park in the Mardyke area of the city, the museum's exhibits focus mainly on the history and archaeology of the Cork area.

Building history 
The original museum building is a converted Georgian house within Cork's Fitzgerald Park. Built in 1845 by the Beamish brewing family, the house and gardens were purchased by Cork Corporation to become part of the 44-acre site of the 1902 Cork International Exhibition. During the 1902 exhibition (a type of "world's fair"), the house hosted visiting dignitaries and royalty such as Edward VII and Queen Alexandra. Following the exhibition, much of the site and gardens were repurposed as a public park, and in 1910, the house was reopened as a museum. Part-used as a local authority air-raid protection office and shelter, the museum partially closed during "The Emergency" (WWII) and reopened in 1945. It was managed by University College Cork until the 1960s, when museum administration reverted to the city council. A single-storey extension was added ahead of Cork's tenure as European City of Culture 2005, and includes increased exhibition space and a café.

Exhibits
Afforded "designated county museum" status by the National Museum of Ireland, the museum is legally allowed to retain objects on behalf of the State or on loan from the National Museum.

Exhibits focus on the archaeological record of the Cork area, including finds from excavations around the city's medieval walls, as well as the economic and municipal history of the city, such as civic regalia and artefacts covering the merchant history of the Port of Cork. Other displays include Bronze Age mining tools from copper mines in West Cork, locally discovered Iron Age helmet horns, and ancient Greek and Egyptian artefacts. Temporary exhibits have covered the Irish experience during World War I, and Irish Traveller culture.

References

External links
Official website

Local museums in the Republic of Ireland
Museums in County Cork
Tourist attractions in Cork (city)
Buildings and structures in Cork (city)
1910 establishments in Ireland
Art museums established in 1910